Robert Povey (born 21 September 1996) is an English-born Canadian rugby union player who plays as a flyhalf for the Houston Sabercats in Major League Rugby (MLR). 

He also plays for the Prairie Wolf Pack in the Canadian Rugby Championship and Canada.

Club statistics

References

Prairie Wolf Pack players
Rugby union fly-halves
Rugby union fullbacks
Alumni of the University of Oxford
1996 births
Living people
Utah Warriors players
Houston SaberCats players
Canadian rugby union players
Canada international rugby union players
Canadian expatriate sportspeople in England
Canadian expatriate sportspeople in the United States